Khamar may refer to:
Khamar, a village in Yemen
Khamar-e Qalandaran, a village in Iran
Khamar Monastery, a Buddhist monastic center in Mongolia
Khamar-Daban, a mountain range in Siberia